Sergliflozin etabonate (INN/USAN, codenamed GW869682X) is an investigational anti-diabetic drug being developed by GlaxoSmithKline. It did not undergo further development after phase II.

Method of action
Sergliflozin inhibits subtype 2 of the sodium-glucose transport proteins (SGLT2), which is responsible for at least 90% of the glucose reabsorption in the kidney. Blocking this transporter causes blood glucose to be eliminated through the urine.

Chemistry
Etabonate refers to the ethyl carbonate group. The remaining structure, which is the active substance, is called sergliflozin.

References

SGLT2 inhibitors
Glucosides
Prodrugs
Phenol ethers
Abandoned drugs